St Cleer was an electoral division of Cornwall in the United Kingdom which returned one member to sit on Cornwall Council between 2009 and 2021. It was abolished at the 2021 local elections, being succeeded by the St Cleer and Menheniot division.

Councillors

Extent
St Cleer represented the villages of St Neot, Darite, Crow's Nest, St Cleer and the hamlets of Warleggan, Redgate, Common Moor, Higher Tremarcoombe, Tremar Coombe, Tremar and Rosecraddoc. The village of Mount was shared with the Lanivet and Blisland division.

The division was nominally abolished during boundary changes at the 2013 election, but remained largely unaffected. Both before and after the boundary changes in 2013, it covered 10,686 hectares.

Election results

2017 election

2013 election

2009 election

References

Electoral divisions of Cornwall Council